This is a list of museums in Albania. In 2017, museums in the country welcomed 200,986 visitors. Most museums are closed on Mondays.

List of museums in Albania

Archaeological museums
 National Archaeological Museum
 Archaeological Museum of Durrës
 Archaeological Museum of Butrint
 Archaeological Museum of Apolonia
 Archaeological Museum of Korçë
 Archaeological Museum of Lezhë
 Archaeological Museum of Saranda
 Museum of Kamenica Tumulus

Ethnographic museums
 Ethnographic Museum of Berat
 Ethnographic Museum of Krujë
 Ethnographic Museum of Elbasan
 Ethnographic Museum of Vlorë
 Ethnographic Museum of Durrës
 Ethnographic Museum of Kukës
 Ethnographic Museum of Gjirokastër
 Ethnographic Museum of Kavajë
 Museum of Rozafa Castle

History museums
 National History Museum
 Skanderbeg Museum
 Congress of Lushnjë Museum
 National Museum of Education
 Museum of National Independence
 History Museum of Shkodër
 History Museum of Fier
 History Museum of Lushnjë
 Historical Relics Museum of Vlorë
 Memorial Museum of Skanderbeg
 History Museum of Mat
 Museum of Pogradec
 Museum of Gramsh
 Bunk'Art 1
 Bunk'Art 2
 Museum of Secret Surveillance
 Communist Crimes Museum
 Museum of LANÇ
 Armed Forces Museum
 Kastrioti Museum of Sinë
 Woman's Museum
 Hebrew Museum

Arts museums
 National Museum of Fine Arts
 Marubi National Museum of Photography
 National Museum of Medieval Art
 Bratko Museum of Oriental Art
 Onufri Iconographic Museum
 Mezuraj Museum
 Gjon Mili Museum
 Home of Poliphony

Collections museums
 Natural Sciences Museum
 Bank of Albania Museum
 Museum of Albanian Stamp
 National Guard Museum
 National Armaments Museum
 Clocks Museum
 Kadare Studio Home

Cult museums
 Sapa Diocese Museum
 Shkodër-Pult Diocese Museum
 Bektashi Museum

See also 
 List of libraries in Albania
 List of archives in Albania
 List of art galleries in Albania
 List of museums by country

References

Albania
Museums
Museums
Museums
Albania